Laribacter is a bacterial genus in the family of Neisseriaceae. Laribacter hongkongensis is the only species in the genus, and it has been isolated from human cases of diarrhea.  However, its role in causing diarrhea is unproven, even though it has been hypothesized.

References

Further reading 
 
 
 

Neisseriales
Monotypic bacteria genera
Bacteria genera